UP International College Auckland is a private school in Auckland, New Zealand, which provides pathways to tertiary study for international students. It has premises in Auckland City, in the central business district. The school has been restructured since the 2005 ERO review as part of an endeavour to provide better tuition for international students.

History 

The school was previously owned by the Academic Colleges Group in New Zealand, known as ACG New Zealand International College. The campus was also home to ACG Norton College, which provided foundation programmes for AUT.

The University of Auckland Foundation programme
The University of Auckland Foundation programme  have been developed for international students and students whose first language is not English, to offer preparation for bachelor's degree study.

The Foundation programme is taught on behalf of the University by the Academic Colleges Group. Foundation study usually takes a year, although accelerated six month programmes are available to suitably qualified students. The Foundation programme is designed to develop skills in:

The style of study at university
Critical and independent thinking
Computer use and research
Essential subject knowledge. For example, in accounting, calculus, chemistry, computer science, design, economics, English, geography, physics and statistics.

Requirements 
Entry to undergraduate degree programmes at The University of Auckland will depend on achieving:
A set academic mark
English language proficiency at a level equivalent to the International English Language Testing System (IELTS) of at least 6.0 overall (with no single band below 5.5)
Meeting any additional programme entry requirements for International Students, such as interviews, auditions or portfolios

The University of Auckland Certificate in Foundation Studies programme
The ACG NZIC offers The University of Auckland Certificate in Foundation Studies programme, accredited by the New Zealand Vice-Chancellors' Committee. In addition, at the inner city campus the ACG English School, a division of the college, has the primary objective of improving students' English in preparation for IELTS examinations and future study. The courses offered by the college have NZQA accreditation.

The University of Auckland Certificate of Foundation Studies belongs to the University of Auckland. Successful completion of the Certificate in Foundation Studies guarantees entry into The University of Auckland and is accepted by all New Zealand universities.

Student achievement
Student achievement is monitored by examinations set by ACG staff and moderated by the University of Auckland personnel.

Pastoral care
The pastoral care of students is a feature of the college. The college emphasises the importance of students being happy in both their classes and homes so that they progress well academically. Student attendance is closely monitored. The deans and group tutors provide academic and social support for students and promote their personal well-being.

Use of ICT
The use of information and communication technologies (ICT) is a feature of the college. Teachers make use of ICT to facilitate teaching and learning and to provide learning resources.

The college provides equipment that enhances student learning. Staff and students have access to computers.

External links
 Official website

References

Secondary schools in Auckland
Private schools in New Zealand
2005 establishments in New Zealand
Educational institutions established in 2005
International education industry